Sugan may refer to:
 Súgán, an Irish word for straw rope
 Sugan, alternate name of Sulaqan, Qom, a village in Iran
 Sugan (album), an album by Phil Woods with Red Garland recorded in 1957